Sandra Browne (born July 27, 1947) is a Trinidadian operatic mezzo-soprano.

Born in Point Fortin, Browne was the only survivor of six children. A scholarship student at Vassar College, upon her 1968 graduation she initially intended on a career in the diplomatic corps before being persuaded to develop her musical abilities. In 1971 she won the Kathleen Ferrier Memorial Competition, and the following year made her British operatic debut singing Ismene in Nabucco at Welsh National Opera. In 1973 she appeared at the Camden Festival as Man Friday in Robinson Crusoé of Jacques Offenbach, and in 1974 she sang Poppea in L'incoronazione di Poppea with Kent Opera. She sang at the English National Opera in such roles as Rosina, Octavian, and Carmen, and in 1975 she sang Dorabella for the Welsh National Opera. In 1991 she received a nomination for the Laurence Olivier Award for Best Performance in a Supporting Role in a Musical for her performances as Lady Thiang in The King and I.

References

1947 births
Living people
Trinidad and Tobago opera singers
20th-century Trinidad and Tobago women singers
20th-century Trinidad and Tobago singers
Operatic mezzo-sopranos
20th-century women opera singers
Vassar College alumni
People from Point Fortin